Leona Brown (born July 27, 1960) is a female boxer who is the WIBC world Bantamweight champion. Because of her age, many consider her to be "the George Foreman of women's boxing". Brown's nickname, "Downtown", is both a homage to actress Downtown Julie Brown, and it also serves as name play, such as in the case of "Hannah The Vegas Fox".

Career
A native of Buffalo, New York, she now lives in Wappinger, New York.

Brown was an award winning amateur boxer, winning the New York state golden gloves award before turning professional, on September 27. 1997, beating Judy Mayrand by a four round unanimous decision in Germantown, Pennsylvania. Brown proceeded to win her first seven fights as a professional, including victories over Sue Chase, Sonya Emery and Suzanne Riccio.

On her eighth professional bout, fought June 11, 1999 in Bossier City, Louisiana, she fought for a world title for the first time, losing a ten round decision to IFBA world Bantamweight champion Eva Jones. Her next bout was a six round unanimous decision loss at the hands of the noted Margaret Sidoroff.

On October 1, 1999, Brown became a world champion for the first time, when she knocked out Dee Dufoe in round ten to become the IFBA's world Super Bantamweight champion.

That short success was followed by defeat and disappointment, however, as she lost seven of her next eight bouts, beginning with a world title unification against WIBF world Super Bantamweight champion Michele Aboro on May 13, 2000. Brown lost a ten round split decision, and her IFBA world title, to Aboro in Germany. Other boxers that defeated her during this period included Alicia Ashley, Kathy Williams and Lisa Brown (twice). Her only win during those eight bouts came against Ria Ramnarine, by a knockout in round four, on July 27 of 2001.

After defeating Renee Richardt, she was given another chance at the WIBF world Super Bantamweight title, flying over to Austria, where she lost to Esther Schouten by a ten round decision, on June 9, 2002. That loss marked the beginning of another losing streak for Brown, as she lost her next three bouts as well. These included a defeat at the hands of Ada Vélez. She broke that streak with a fourth round knockout of Terri Cruz on April 23, 2004, in Denver, Colorado.

After another loss and a win, she was given another chance at becoming world champion again, and, on November 20, Brown took on Stephaney George of Guyana for the WIBC world Bantamweight title, in Poughkeepsie, New York. Brown won a world title on a second division when she beat George by a unanimous decision, on a fight that the judges saw as a one-sided affair (all three judges scored the fight 100-90 in favor of Brown).

Leona Brown holds a professional boxing record of 13 wins and 14 losses, with 5 knockout wins.

Professional boxing record

See also
 List of female boxers

References

External links
 Leona Brown at Awakening Fighters
 

1960 births
Living people
American women boxers
Bantamweight boxers
Sportspeople from Buffalo, New York
Boxers from New York (state)
Wappinger, New York
World boxing champions
African-American boxers
21st-century African-American people
21st-century African-American women
20th-century African-American sportspeople
20th-century African-American women
20th-century African-American people